Allison Fisher  (born 24 February 1968) is an English professional pool and former professional snooker player.

Biography
Fisher was born on 24 February 1968 in Cheshunt and grew up in Tonbridge, Kent and lived later in Peacehaven, East Sussex. She started playing snooker when she was 7. She won her first world title at the age of 17. To date, she has won over 80 national titles and 11 world titles in total. Throughout the 1980s, she made various attempts to qualify for the main Men's snooker tour, which contained around 128 players at the time, but these attempts were unsuccessful. However, by 1991, the tour had changed considerably meaning all players had to do to become a 'professional' on the main tour was pay an entry fee. This meant over 500 players played in qualifying rounds for the ranking tournaments. Fisher reached round 4 of the qualifying rounds of the 1994 World Championship where she was beaten by Roger Garrett 10–4. She was unable to progress into the higher reaches of the ranking lists and by 1997 she lost her professional status. Feeling that she did not receive the same respect as the male players, she moved to the United States to play on the WPBA Tour. On 18 March 2009, she endorsed the Delta-13 billiard rack and has her own signature series.

Fisher did not take long to make her mark in the world of pool, winning only the second tournament that she played in. She has an unequalled record, winning over 60 WPBA titles as of 2021, which includes 4 world 9-Ball championships. Since her move, she has also been the highest-earning player on a number of occasions, which takes into account male and female players. Matchroom sports invited her to play in the Matchroom snooker league, and she was also invited to play in the Mosconi Cup 1994, when Europe lost 16:12 against Team USA.

She was the top-ranked player on the Women's Professional Billiards Association (WPBA) circuit from September 1996 to June 2001, and again each year from 2002 to 2007.

In 2009, Fisher was inducted into the Billiard Congress of America Hall of Fame.

Fisher was nicknamed "the Duchess of Doom" and gained a reputation similar to that of the sixteen-time darts world champion Phil Taylor and snooker players Joe Davis, Steve Davis and Stephen Hendry in the 1930s and 80s–90s, respectively. Her greatest season was the 2000/2001 season when she won 8 consecutive major pro pool tournaments. In the 2005 season, Fisher was the highest earner, winning £111,000.

In 2007, she was declared the female Player of the Year by all three of the major pool publications, Billiards Digest, Pool & Billiard Magazine, and InsidePOOL Magazine (in each case with Shane Van Boening as her male co-recipient of the honor), and also ranked #1 in the P&B "Fans' Top 20 Favorite Players" poll for that year. She has been the BD female Player of the Year for 11 of the 12 years spanning 1996–2007, including 6 in a row, 2002–2007.

Fisher was appointed Member of the Order of the British Empire (MBE) in the 2022 New Year Honours for services to sport.

Titles and achievements

Snooker

Pool

 A record 60 WPBA titles
 Billiards Digest Player of the Year 1996-2000, 2002-2007
 Billiards Digest Player of the Decade 1990–1999, 2000-2010
 1999 Billiards Digest 9th Greatest Living Player of the Century
 2007 Pool & Billiard Magazine Fans #1 Favorite Player
 2009 Billiard Congress of America Hall of Fame
 2016 WPBA Hall of Fame
 2022 World Women's Snooker Hall of Fame
 2022 Member of the Order of the British Empire (MBE).

References

External links
Official site
Allison Fisher on "Xtreme Pressbox" podcast by Inside Pool Magazine
Official Delta-13 site

1968 births
Living people
English pool players
English snooker players
Female pool players
Female snooker players
People from Hadlow
World champions in pool
People from Peacehaven
Lesbian sportswomen
English LGBT sportspeople
World Games gold medalists
Competitors at the 2009 World Games
LGBT cue sports players
Competitors at the 2005 World Games
People from Tonbridge
Sportspeople from Kent
People from Cheshunt
21st-century English LGBT people
Members of the Order of the British Empire